Menindee County is one of the 141 Cadastral divisions of New South Wales. It is located between the Darling River and the South Australian border. Menindee is at its north-eastern edge. The Menindee Lakes are located there.

The name Menindee is of unknown origin.

Parishes within this county
A full list of parishes found within this county; their current LGA and mapping coordinates to the approximate centre of each location is as follows:

References

Counties of New South Wales